"I Have Never Seen" is Namie Amuro's 11th single on the Avex Trax label. Released after a year hiatus, it serves their lead single for her fourth studio album Genius 2000, it debuted at #1 on January 11, 1999. It is her ninth number one single, and was her last until 2008's 60s 70s 80s. The single was certified double platinum by the RIAJ for 800,000 copies shipped to stores.

Commercial endorsements 
"I Have Never Seen" was used as the ending theme to Nihon TV drama, "Yonige-ya Honpo" (KIKU translation given as "Flight By Night" when it aired in Hawaii.)

Track listing 
 "I Have Never Seen (Single Mix)" (Tetsuya Komuro) – 4:46
 "I Have Never Seen (With Her Soul Mix)" (Remixed by Urban Soul) – 5:34
 "I Have Never Seen (Instrumental)" (Tetsuya Komuro) – 4:43

Personnel 
 Namie Amuro – vocals
 Kazuhiro Matsuo – guitar
 Yuko Kawai – background vocals
 David Lawson – background vocals
 Minako Obata – background vocals
 Kenji Sano – background vocals

Production 
 Producer – Tetsuya Komuro
 Arrangement – Tetsuya Komuro
 Mixing – Ken Kessie
 Remixing – Urban Soul

Charts 
Oricon Sales Chart (Japan)

Oricon Sales Chart (Japan)

References

Goto Maki sang this song for an audition before becoming a part of Morning Musume.

1998 singles
Namie Amuro songs
Oricon Weekly number-one singles
Japanese television drama theme songs
Songs written by Tetsuya Komuro
1998 songs
Avex Trax singles